Balpınar is a town (belde) in the Batman District of Batman Province in Turkey. The town had a population of 5,685 in 2021.

References 

Populated places in Batman Province
Kurdish settlements in Batman Province
Batman District